CAG or cag may refer to:

 Cagoule, a lightweight weatherproof raincoat or anorak with a hood.
 CAG promoter, used in molecular biology
 CAG, a codon for the amino acid glutamine
 Cagliari–Elmas Airport (IATA airport code: CAG) in Cagliari, Sardinia, Italy
 Canadian Association of Geographers
 Chassis Air Guide, in computers is Intel's thermal solution to PC chassis
 Cheap Ass Gamer, an online BBS community
 China National Aviation Corporation (ICAO airline designator: CAG)
 Chinese Academy of Governance, a training center for middle and senior government officials of the Chinese government
 Civil Affairs Group, an acronym for United States Marine Corps Civil Affairs Groups
 Closed angle glaucoma, a type of eye disease.
 Colegio Americano de Guatemala (American School of Guatemala) 
 Combat Applications Group, an abbreviation of the former official name of Delta Force, a United States Army Special Operations Command military unit
 Commander, Air Group, the informal name for the senior US Navy officer of a carrier air wing
 Commentaria in Aristotelem Graeca, a series of original-language texts of ancient and Byzantine commentaries on Aristotle
 Communication Arts Guild, an organisation dedicated to the Indian advertising industry.
 Comptroller and Auditor General, a senior civil servant charged with improving government accountability.
 Computer-assisted gaming, used for example for PnP role-playing games
 ConAgra Foods Inc., stock ticker on New York Stock Exchange
 Consensus audit guidelines, a set of twenty security controls for cyber defense published by the SANS Institute
 Consumer Action Group, a UK forum which provides free help and support on consumer issues.
 Coronary angiography, a technique to visualize the arteries of the heart muscle
 Craig–Moffat Airport (FAA airport code: CAG) in Craig, Colorado, United States
 Nivaclé language (ISO 639-3 code), a language spoken in Paraguay and Argentina